The Government of the Philippines has three interdependent branches: the legislative, executive, and judicial branches. The Philippines is governed as a unitary state under a presidential representative and democratic constitutional republic in which the president functions as both the head of state and the head of government of the country within a pluriform multi-party system.

The powers of the three branches are vested by the Constitution of the Philippines in the following: Legislative power is vested in the two-chamber Congress of the Philippines—the Senate is the upper chamber and the House of Representatives is the lower chamber. Executive power is exercised by the government under the leadership of the president. Judicial power is vested in the courts with the Supreme Court of the Philippines as the highest judicial body.

Legislative branch 
The legislative power is vested in the Congress of the Philippines which consists of the Senate of the Philippines and the House of Representatives. The upper house is located in Pasay, while the lower house is located in Quezon City; both are in Metro Manila. The district and sectoral representatives are elected for a term of three years; they can be re-elected but they may not run for a fourth consecutive term.

Senators are elected to a term of six years; they can be re-elected but may not run for a third consecutive term. The House of Representatives may opt to pass for a vacancy of a legislative seat, which leads to a special election. The winner of the special election will serve the unfinished term of the previous district representative, and will be considered as one elective term. The same rule also applies in the Senate; however, it only applies if the seat was vacated before a regular legislative election.

The current president of the Senate is Juan Miguel Zubiri, and the speaker of the House of Representatives is Martin Romualdez.

National government 
Senate
House of Representatives

Local government 
Bangsamoro Parliament (an autonomous region in Mindanao)
Sangguniang Panlalawigan (Provincial Council)
Sangguniang Panlungsod (City Council)
Sangguniang Bayan (Municipal Council)
Sangguniang Barangay (Barangay Council)

Executive branch 
The president and vice president are elected separately by national popular vote. The vice president is first in line to succession if the president resigns, is removed after impeachment, permanently incapacitated or dies. The vice president is usually, though not always, a member of the president's cabinet. If there is a vacancy in the position of vice-president, the president will appoint any member of Congress (usually a party member) as the new vice president. The appointment must then be validated by a three-fourths vote of the Congress.

The current president and vice president are Bongbong Marcos and Sara Duterte, respectively.

National government 
 President
 Vice President
 Cabinet secretaries

Local government 
 Regional chief minister
 Provincial governor
 Provincial vice governor
 City/Municipal mayor
 City/Municipal vice mayor
 Barangay chairman

Judicial branch 

The judicial power is vested in the Supreme Court of the Philippines and lower courts established by law. The Supreme Court, which has a chief justice as its head and 14 associate justices, occupies the highest tier of the judiciary. The justices serve until the age of 70. The justices are appointed by the president on the recommendation of the Judicial and Bar Council of the Philippines. The sitting chief justice is Alexander Gesmundo, the 27th to serve in that position.

Other court types of courts, of varying jurisdiction around the archipelago, are the following:

Lower Collegiate Courts:
Court of Appeals
Court of Tax Appeals
Sandiganbayan (a special appellate court)
Regular Courts:
Regional Trial Courts
First-level courts:
Metropolitan Trial Courts
Municipal Trial Courts
Municipal Trial Courts in Cities
Municipal Circuit Trial Courts
Sharia Courts:
Sharia District Courts
Sharia Circuit Courts

Constitutional commissions 
Article 9 of the Constitution of the Philippines establishes three independent constitutional commissions: the Civil Service Commission, the Commission on Elections, and the Commission on Audit.

The Civil Service Commission is the central personnel agency of the Philippine government. It is responsible for strengthening employment and a conducive work environment in the civil service sector and overseeing the Civil Service Exam, a civil service entrance examination to assess qualifications and work integrity for employment in the sector.

The Commission on Elections enforces and administers all laws and regulations related to the conducting of elections, plebiscites, initiatives, referendums, and recalls. It decides on all decisions surrounding election protests and contests and has the right to deputize and take control of law enforcement and state security forces to ensure the free and orderly conduct of elections.

The Commission on Audit is responsible for examining, auditing, and settling all revenues and expenditures of public funds and properties used by the government or its attached agencies.

Office of the ombudsman 

The Philippine government or three of its branches are independently monitored by the office of the ombudsman. The ombudsman is given the mandate to investigate and prosecute any government official allegedly guilty of crimes, especially graft and corruption. The ombudsman is assisted by six deputies: the overall deputy, the deputy for Luzon, the deputy for Visayas, the deputy for Mindanao, the deputy for the armed forces, and the special prosecutor.

Local government 

The Philippines has four main classes of elected administrative divisions, often lumped together as local government units (LGUs). They are, from the highest to the lowest division:
Autonomous and administrative regions
Provinces and independent cities
Municipalities and component cities
Barangays

References